Francesco Corsinelli (born 21 November 1997) is an Italian footballer who plays as a midfielder for  club Gubbio.

Club career

Genoa 
He made his first appearance on the bench for the main squad of Geona on 20 April 2016 in a Serie A game against Inter.

Loan to Pontedera 
On 9 July 2016, Corsinelli was signed by Serie C club Pontedera on a 2-season loan deal. On 31 July he made his professional debut in a 3–1 away defeat against Foggia in the first round of Coppa Italia, he played the entire match. On 28 August 2016 he made his Serie C debut for Pontedera as a substitute replacing Roberto Bonaventura in the 82nd minute of a 1–1 home draw against Robur Siena. On 14 September he played his first entire match in Serie C for Pontedera, a 1–1 away draw against Pistoiese. On 25 March 2017, Corsinelli scored his first professional goal in the 17th minute of a 1–1 away draw against Cremonese. Corsinelli ended his first season at Pontedera with 33 appearances, 1 goal and 2 assists.

Corsinelli started his second season with Pontedera on 27 August with a 1–1 home draw against Alessandria, he played the entire match. On 8 October he scored his first goal of the season in the 69th minute of a 3–0 home win over Piacenza. On 23 October he scored his second goal in the 33rd minute of a 2–2 home draw against Pistoiese. Six days later he scored his third consecutive goal in the 55th minute of a 2–1 home win over Gavorrano. Corsinelli ended his season with 28 appearances, all as a starter and 3 goals. In total he played 61 matches, scored 4 goals and made 2 assists.

Loan to FeralpiSalò 
On 21 July 2018, Corsinelli was loaned to Serie C side FeralpiSalò on a season-long loan deal. On 29 July he made his debut for FeralpiSalò in a 2–0 home win over Virtus Francavilla in the first round of Coppa Italia, he was replaced after 75 minutes for Davide Mordini. Nine days later, on 7 August, he played in the second round as a substitute replacing Davide Mordini in the 91st minute of a 1–0 away defeat after extra-time against Lecce. On 7 September he played his first match for FeralpiSalò in Serie C, a 3–1 home win over Teramo, he was replaced by Andrea Ferretti in the 54th minute. In January 2019, Corsinelli was re-called to Genoa leaving FeralpiSalò with 12 appearances, only 3 as a starter, but he never played any entire match.

Piacenza
On 30 January 2019, Corsinelli moved to Piacenza for an undisclosed fee on a permanent basis. Four days later, on 3 February he made his debut for Piacenza in a 0–0 away draw against Novara, he played the entire match. Corsinelli ended his first half season to Piacenza with 14 appearances, including 13 as a starter, and 1 assist. He also helps Piacenza to reach the play-off final, however Piacenza lost 2–0 on aggregate against Trapani, he played both matches.

Bari 
After only 7 month at Piacenza, on 18 July 2019, Corsinelli signed to newly promoted Serie C side Bari for an undisclosed fee and he signed a 3-year contract.

Loan to Novara
On 27 January 2021, he joined Novara on loan.

Gubbio
On 16 July 2022, Corsinelli signed a two-year contract with Gubbio.

Career statistics

Club

References

1997 births
Living people
People from Pietrasanta
Sportspeople from the Province of Lucca
Footballers from Tuscany
Italian footballers
Association football midfielders
Serie C players
Genoa C.F.C. players
U.S. Città di Pontedera players
FeralpiSalò players
Piacenza Calcio 1919 players
S.S.C. Bari players
Novara F.C. players
S.S.D. Lucchese 1905 players
A.S. Gubbio 1910 players